Bilabənd (also, Bilaband, Blaband, and Balabant) is a village and municipality in the Lerik Rayon of Azerbaijan.  It has a population of 766.

References 

Populated places in Lerik District